Kunhu Muhammed Puthanpurakkal (born 5 March 1987) is an Indian sprinter who specialises in the 400 metres event. He participated in the 4 × 400 metres relay event at the 2016 Summer Olympics.

In July 2016, Muhammed was part of the relay team that broke the national 4 × 400 metres relay at Bangalore and qualified for the Olympics. The quartet of Muhammed, Mohammad Anas, Ayyasamy Dharun and Arokia Rajiv clocked 3:00:91, rewriting the national record of 3:02.17 set by themselves four weeks earlier in Turkey. The performance also helped the relay team jump to 13th place in the world rankings. Muhammed is a 3-time Asian Games finalist and national champion.

References

External links
 

1987 births
Living people
People from Palakkad district
Indian male sprinters
Athletes from Kerala
Athletes (track and field) at the 2016 Summer Olympics
Athletes (track and field) at the 2010 Asian Games
Athletes (track and field) at the 2014 Asian Games
Athletes (track and field) at the 2018 Asian Games
Asian Games medalists in athletics (track and field)
Asian Games silver medalists for India
Medalists at the 2018 Asian Games
Olympic athletes of India
South Asian Games gold medalists for India
South Asian Games silver medalists for India
South Asian Games medalists in athletics